Willem de Vos may refer to:
Willem de Vos (academic)
Willem de Vos (painter)